VideoPad Video Editor (or simply VideoPad) is a video editing application developed by NCH Software. It is complemented by the VirtualDub plug-ins that work with the software. VideoPad integrates WavePad, a sound-editing program; MixPad, a sound-mixing program; and PhotoPad, an image editor.

Features

VideoPad supports frequently used file formats including Audio Video Interleave (AVI), Windows Media Video (WMV), 3GP, and DivX. It supports direct video uploads to YouTube, Flickr, and Facebook.

VideoPad uses two screens: the first for a preliminary review of chosen video and audio snippets and the second to review the entire track. The application supports several video effects, including those involving light, color, transitions, and text.

VideoPad is presumably trialware. The free edition is feature-limited, in particular only AVI and WMV export is supported, while the non-free version has more advanced features. VideoPad Master Edition supports plugins while the free version does not. The non-free edition does not limit simultaneous video tracks, but the free one allows at most two concurrent tracks and limits export file type options after the trial period expires. VideoPad is also available on Steam.

Reception
VideoPad has received generally favorable reviews from CNET and TopTenReviews, but has been noted to be vulnerable to rendering issues.

Redding Record Searchlight columnist Andrea Eldridge wrote in 2012 that the "easy-to-use VideoPad brings advanced features to the beginner". She said that VideoPad has a voice-over feature Windows Movie Maker did not have. The feature allows users to either record their own narration or upload existing recordings. Softonic.com said VideoPad was "simple" and "easy to use" but noted that "more advanced users will definitely find it too basic" and lamented that the program had "only three [transitions]". Danny Chadwick of Top Ten Reviews rated VideoPad a 6.15/10. He said the application was "great for beginners" but that it lacked "many of the transitions or extras that are standard in similar applications". Maximum PC contributor Ben Kim stated in 2014 that "VideoPad is easily the best free video editor available." Kim wrote that VideoPad is "a stellar editor that manages to pack an almost obscene number of features into a surprisingly digestible package".

See also
 Comparison of video editing software

References

External links
 VideoPad Video Editor Official Site

Video editing software
C++ software
Proprietary software
Video editing software for Windows
MacOS multimedia software